"That's All I Want from You" is a popular song by Fritz Rotter (writing as "M. Rotha"), published in 1955.

The song was recorded by a number of artists, but became a major hit for Jaye P. Morgan, reaching No. 3 on the Billboard chart in the United States. The Silva-Tones re-charted the song in 1957, utilizing a somewhat bizarre arrangement blending rockabilly and doo-wop.

Recorded versions

Larry Darnell (recorded January 20, 1955, released by Savoy Records as catalog number 1151)
Dean Martin (recorded November 26, 1954)
Jaye P. Morgan with Hugo Winterhalter's orchestra (recorded October 2, 1954, released by RCA Victor as catalog number 20-5896)
Bing Crosby recorded the song in 1955 for use on his radio show and it was subsequently included in the box set The Bing Crosby CBS Radio Recordings (1954-56) issued by Mosaic Records (catalog MD7-245) in 2009. 
Bobby Bare with Skeeter Davis (recorded 1965, album Tunes for Two)
Nina Simone (recorded January 17–21, 1978, released by CTI Records as catalog number 7084 album Baltimore, 1978)
Dinah Washington (recorded January 11, 1955, released by Mercury Records as catalog number 70537)
Audrey Williams (released by MGM Records as catalog number 11935)
The York Brothers (released by King Records as catalog number 1434)
Aretha Franklin (1970 on Atlantic Records LP Spirit in the Dark)
Barbara McNair
Oscar Toney Jr
Ernestine Anderson
 Sachal Vasandani 2011

References

1955 singles
Dinah Washington songs
Nina Simone songs
1955 songs